Southwestern Mandarin, also known as Upper Yangtze Mandarin, is a Mandarin Chinese language spoken in much of Southwest China, including in Sichuan, Yunnan, Chongqing, Guizhou, most parts of Hubei, the northwestern part of Hunan, the northern part of Guangxi and some southern parts of Shaanxi and Gansu.

Southwestern Mandarin is spoken by roughly 260 million people. If considered a language distinct from central Mandarin, it would be the eighth-most spoken language by native speakers in the world, behind Mandarin itself, Spanish, English, Hindi, Portuguese, Arabic and Bengali.

Overview
Modern Southwestern Mandarin was formed by the waves of immigrants brought to the regions during the Ming and Qing Dynasties.  Because of the comparatively recent move, such dialects show more similarity to modern Standard Mandarin than to other varieties of Chinese like Cantonese or Hokkien. For example, like most Southern Chinese dialects, Southwestern Mandarin does not possess the retroflex consonants (zh, ch, sh, r) of Standard Mandarin, but most varieties of it also fail to retain the checked tone that all southern dialects have. The Chengdu-Chongqing and Hubei dialects are believed to reflect aspects of the Mandarin lingua franca that was spoken during the Ming. However, some scholars believe its origins may be more similar to Lower Yangtze Mandarin. Though part of the Mandarin group, Southwestern Mandarin has many striking and pronounced differences with Standard Mandarin such that until 1955, it was generally categorized alongside Cantonese and Wu Chinese as a branch of Chinese varieties.

Southwestern Mandarin is commonly spoken in Kokang district in Northern Myanmar, where the population is largely Kokang. Southwestern Mandarin is also one of two official languages of the Wa State, an unrecognized autonomous state within Myanmar, alongside the Wa language. Because Wa has no written form, Chinese is the official working language of the Wa State government. Some of its speakers, known as the Chin Haw, live in Thailand. It is also spoken in parts of Northern Vietnam. Ethnic minorities in Vietnam's Lào Cai Province used to speak Southwestern Mandarin to each other when their languages were not mutually intelligible. Southwestern Mandarin is also used between different ethnic minorities in Yunnan, Guizhou and Guangxi.

Phonology

Tones
Most Southwestern Mandarin dialects have, like Standard Mandarin, retained only four of the eight tones of Late Middle Chinese. However, the entering tone has completely merged with the light-level tone in most Southwestern dialects, but in Standard Mandarin, it is seemingly randomly dispersed among the remaining tones.

Syllables
Southwestern Mandarin dialects do not possess the retroflex consonants of Standard Mandarin but share most other Mandarin phonological features. For example, the sounds "la" and "na" are generally indistinguishable, and the same is true for the sounds "fen" and "feng". Some varieties also lack a distinction between the labiodental  and the glottal .

Subdivisions

Southwestern Mandarin was classified into twelve dialect groups in the Language Atlas of China:
 Cheng–Yu 成渝: Chengdu and Chongqing
 Dianxi 滇西 (western Yunnan): Yao–Li 姚里 and Bao–Lu 保潞 clusters
 Qianbei 黔北 (northern Guizhou)
 Kun–Gui 昆貴: Kunming and Guiyang
 Guan–Chi 灌赤 (central Sichuan from Guan County to the Chishui River and part of northern Yunnan): Minjiang 岷江, Ren–Fu 仁富, Ya–Mian 雅棉, and Li–Chuan 丽川 clusters
 Ebei 鄂北 (northern Hubei)
 Wu–Tian 武天: Wuhan and Tianmen (Hubei)
 Cen–Jiang 岑江 (eastern Guizhou)
 Qiannan 黔南 (southern Guizhou)
 Xiangnan 湘南 (southern Hunan): Yongzhou and Chenzhou
 Gui–Liu 桂柳 (northern Guangxi): Guilin and Liuzhou
 Chang–He 常鹤: Changde and Zhangjiajie (northwestern Hunan) and Hefeng County (southwestern Hubei)

See also
Sichuanese dialects

References

Sichuanese
Mandarin Chinese
Languages of Thailand
Languages of Vietnam
Languages of Myanmar
Languages of Laos